Tommy Coyle may refer to:

 Tommy Coyle (boxer) (born 1989), British former professional boxer
 Tommy Coyle (footballer) (born 1959), Scottish former professional football midfielder

See also
 Thomas Coyle (disambiguation)